Rebeca Viviana Veloz Ramirez is an Ecuadorian politician who represents the Santo Domingo de los Tsáchilas Province in the National Assembly.

Life
Veloz was elected to represent the Province of Santo Domingo de los Tsáchilas with Ruiz Emerson Hinojosa as her substitute. The other assemblymen (sic) from her province are 
Jose Ricardo Chavez Valencia, Gruber Cesario Zambrano Azua and Amada Maria Ortiz Olaya.

She serves on the Permanent Commission on Biodiversity and Natural Resources.

In June 2022, Veloz raised a formal protest against humiliating and insulting remarks made by the head of the Pachakutik caucus, Salvador Quishpe, in the National Assembly. She requested that he be suspended from the assembly for 30 days. Witnesses to the offending words included Jhajaira Urresta.

On 24 June 2022 she was among the members who requested a debate concerning the replacement of President Guillermo Lasso. 46 other members signed the request including , Victoria Desintonio, Vanessa Álava, Sofia Espin, Jhajaira Urresta, Patricia Mendoza and Rosa Mayorga.

References

Living people
Year of birth missing (living people)
Members of the National Assembly (Ecuador)
Women members of the National Assembly (Ecuador)
21st-century Ecuadorian women politicians
21st-century Ecuadorian politicians